Mary L. Jones was the Los Angeles City Librarian until she was fired in 1905 to be replaced by a man, Charles Fletcher Lummis. This decision would set off a firestorm across the city called the Great Library War of 1905.

Jones had a B.A. degree from University of Wisconsin (1885) and had studied under Melvil Dewey at the New York State Library School where she graduated in 1892. She then served as a librarian at the University of Illinois and the State Library of Iowa.

In 1899, she came to Pasadena and began work at the Los Angeles Public Library, where she served as assistant librarian under Harriet Childs Wadleigh, Los Angeles City Librarian. Jones was hired as the City Librarian when Wadleigh retired in 1900. Jones was the first Los Angeles City Librarian working for the Los Angeles Public Library who was both a college graduate and a graduate of library school.

Jones was asked to resign in June 1905 by the Board of Library Directors. She delivered a letter to the Board saying that she refused to resign simply to make way for a man: “At first it was my inclination immediately to yield to the request relayed upon me by the president. But, upon reflection, I have concluded that it would not be fitting for me to tender my resignation as the head of a department where only women are employed. When such a resignation is tendered solely on the grounds that the best interests of the department demand that its affairs no longer be administered by a woman. Ever since the adoption of the present city charter, the library has been presided over by a woman with a staff of assistants composed exclusively of women."

There ensued a lengthy debate among city leaders, women's clubs, the press, and librarians nationwide over the legality of her dismissal. Susan B. Anthony, had attended a library board meeting in support of Jones and then spoke of the library dispute at a women's rights meeting. Eight separate hearings produced over 500 pages of transcripts, but the council upheld Jones's termination.

Her record of service and the misogyny directed against her are well documented in newspaper articles of the time and in The Library Book, by Susan Orlean and in archival records from LAPL. L.A. City Archivist Michael Holland says even though the Library Commission had expressed concerns about her, Jones had received glowing performance reviews year after year. They has also refused a modest raise in Jones’ salary despite the greater salary offered to Lummis: "Jones was fired just before a change to the civil service rules took effect that would have made it harder to fire her without cause. Not shockingly in 1906, several library commissioners said on the record that they preferred a man to be in charge of the library system."

After her firing, Jones left L.A. to work in Berkeley and Bryn Mawr. She returned to 1920 to help set up the new L.A. County library system.

Further reading
"Library Wars: The Making of Librarianship at the Los Angeles Public Library, 1890–1910" by Debra Gold Hansen, Libraries: Culture, History, and Society Libraries: Culture, History, and Society, Vol. 1, No. 1 (2017), pp. 97–125 (29 pages) (Available on JStor)

References

American librarians
American women librarians
University of Wisconsin–Madison alumni
University of Illinois Urbana-Champaign faculty
19th-century births
20th-century deaths
Year of birth missing

Year of death missing